David Flamholc (born 27 September 1974) is a Swedish filmmaker and director. He lives in London and works through his company Caravan Film together with his father Leon Flamholc.

References

External links
 
 
 

1974 births
Living people
Swedish film directors
Swedish film producers
Swedish screenwriters
Swedish male screenwriters